Matthew Anderson (born October 31, 1982) is an American former professional ice hockey player. He played in the National Hockey League with the New Jersey Devils.

Early life
Anderson was born in West Islip, New York. As a youth, he played in the 1996 Quebec International Pee-Wee Hockey Tournament with the New York Islanders minor ice hockey team.

Career 
Prior to the 2010–11 season with the Albany Devils, Anderson attended the New Jersey Devils training camp. On January 29, 2013, Anderson made his NHL debut for the Devils against the Boston Bruins at TD Garden during the 2012–13 season. He recorded his first NHL point in a 5-4 overtime loss to the New York Islanders.

On May 5, 2013, Anderson signed his first professional contract in Russia, signing a one-year deal with HC Spartak Moscow of the KHL. In his first KHL season in 2013–14, Anderson secured his place among the checking lines of Spartak Moscow, to finish the season with 11 goals and 20 points in 54 games.

He transferred on a one-year deal to fellow KHL club, KHL Medveščak Zagreb on June 11, 2014. In the 2014–15 season, Anderson appeared in 35 games with the Croatian-based club, scoring 19 points before he was traded mid-season to Neftekhimik Nizhnekamsk in exchange for financial compensation on December 3, 2014. He finished the season with Nizhnekamsk with 16 points in 28 games, easily surpassing his first year in the KHL.

On April 9, 2015, Anderson moved to his fourth club in three years as he moved to the Swedish Hockey League as a free agent with Djurgårdens IF. He completed his 12-year professional career following further stints with Skellefteå AIK and Rögle BK.

Career statistics

References

External links

1982 births
Living people
Albany Devils players
American expatriate ice hockey players in Sweden
Chicago Wolves players
Djurgårdens IF Hockey players
Gwinnett Gladiators players
HC Spartak Moscow players
Ice hockey players from New York (state)
KHL Medveščak Zagreb players
HC Neftekhimik Nizhnekamsk players
New Jersey Devils players
People from West Islip, New York
Rögle BK players
Skellefteå AIK players
UMass Minutemen ice hockey players
Undrafted National Hockey League players
American men's ice hockey right wingers